Alberto Milian (born November 12, 1960) is an American lawyer and judge from Florida. He is a judge of the Eleventh Judicial Circuit Court of Florida.

He won the primary election on August 26, 2014, and assumed office on January 6, 2015. His term expires on January 4, 2021.

Elections

2014

Milian ran for election to the Eleventh Circuit Court.
Primary: He was elected in the primary on August 26, 2014, receiving 57.9 percent of the vote.

He competed against Mary C. Gomez.

Education 
Milian earned his Bachelor of Arts in public administration from Florida International University in 1983 and his Juris Doctor from the Florida State University College of Law.

Military career 
Milian served in the United States Army Reserve from 1980 to 1998. He graduated from the U.S. Army Parachutist and Officer Candidate School in 1981. Milian is a veteran of two wars: Operation Just Cause (Panama) and Operation Desert Storm (Persian Gulf War).

Military decorations 
 Bronze Star
 Meritorious Service Medal
 National Defense Service Medal
 Army Achievement Medal
 Armed Forces Expeditionary Medal
 Southwest Asia Service Medal
 Saudi Arabia Liberation Medal
 Kuwait Liberation Medal

Career 
 2015–2021: Judge, Eleventh Circuit Court
 2000–2014: Criminal defense attorney 
 1988–2000: Prosecutor, Broward County State Attorney's Office
 1994–2000: Career Offender Unit

Career highlights 
 80 percent conviction rate in jury trials as prosecutor of the Career Offender Unit.
 Conducted "over 300 jury trials including charges of murder, robbery, burglary, and other violent crimes."
 Host of two radio shows: Habla el Pueblo on WKAT-AM, Radio Uno from 2001 to 2002 and Habla el Pueblo and Que Opina Usted? on WWFE-AM from 2000 to 2001.
 Worked as a military and political analyst, and he is a published author. He has written opinion editorials, columns, and essays on a variety of topics for newspapers and magazines.

Awards and associations

Awards 
 2002: Best AM Radio Personality, Miami New Times
 City of Miami Police Department, Internal Affairs and Public Corruption Unit Citation for services rendered in public corruption investigations
 Drug Enforcement Administration citation for investigation and prosecution of high-profile narcotics investigation
 Central Intelligence Agency Director's citation for meritorious service during a time of hostilities

Associations 
 City of Aventura Community Services Advisory Board
 Miami-Dade County Unsafe Structures Board
 City of Miami Citizen's Review Panel on Police-Community Relations
 Member of Delvista Condominium Owner's Association Board of Directors
 Lifetime member of the Veterans of Foreign Wars (VFW)
 Association of Former Intelligence Officers (AFIO)

Noteworthy events

Terrorism attack hits close to home, spurs Milian to public service 
In the mid-1970s, Alberto Milian's father, Emilio, was injured in a terrorist attack. Emilio was a popular, conservative radio host in the Miami area. On his show, "El Pueblo Habla," Emilio often spoke out against the violence in Miami during the anti-Castro movement. One day in April 1976, Emilio left the radio station where he hosted his show. When he turned the ignition of his car, a bomb that had been planted under the engine exploded. He lost both legs in the attack but did not lose his life.

This attack had a great impact on young Alberto Milian. Though he says he is not "a teary-eyed, worshipful son," Milian credits his father and those of his generation with waging a principled, non-violent battle against Fidel Castro. After Emilio's death in 2001, Milian began his own investigation into the attack, though no one was ever brought to trial for the crime.

Milian said he became a lawyer partly because of his father's tragedy. Where Emilio used the airwaves to get his message out, Alberto uses the law and politics.

Reputation for professional aggressiveness 
Milian was referred to as a "pitbull" in a piece by the St. Petersburg Times because of his courtroom outbursts and behavior. In 1999, after prosecuting a domestic violence case for the Broward County State Attorney's Office, Milian made controversial comments in public regarding not only the defense counsel in the case, but also the jurors. He called defense attorneys "maggots" and jurors "lobotomized zombies." Milian later said that he made those comments because the victim in the case was "maligned" by the defense during the trial. Milian left the Broward County State Attorney's Office the following year (2000) and entered solo practice. On another occasion, Milian punched a defense attorney in the lobby of a courthouse. Milian says he was provoked by the other attorney and that he acted in self-defense. This altercation led to Milian being suspended from the practice of law for a short period of time.

External links 
 The Eleventh Judicial Circuit of Florida, "About the Court"
 Alberto Milian for 11th Circuit Judge
 Florida Trial Courts, "Circuit Court"

Footnotes 
 ↑ See Judicial selection in Florida.
 ↑ Florida Secretary of State, “Candidate Listing for 2014 General Election,” accessed May 5, 2014
 ↑ Miami Herald, "Two incumbent Miami-Dade judges lose; Miami assistant city attorney wins seat," August 27, 2014
 ↑ 7.0 7.1 7.2 St. Petersburg Times, "His father's voice," December 5, 2002
 ↑ 9.0 9.1 9.2 9.3 9.4 Beached Miami, "Miamians: Alberto Milian, son of Miami terrorism victim," October 18, 2010
 ↑ 10.0 10.1 10.2 Daily Business Review, "Group 27: Alberto Milian and Mary Gomez," August 8, 2014

References

1960 births
Living people
Florida state court judges
20th-century American lawyers
21st-century American lawyers
Florida lawyers
21st-century American judges
United States Army reservists
Florida International University alumni
Florida State University College of Law alumni